The flag of Altai Krai, in the Russian Federation, is a vertical bicolor of light-blue and red charged with a spike of wheat on the blue band and the arms of the krai on the red band. The design follows the pattern of the flags of the Russian SFSR. This center design on the flag is the coat of arms of Altai Krai. The coat of arms was adopted on 25 May 2000. The flag was adopted on 29 June 2000 during a session of the Altai Krai Council of People's Deputies.

References

External links
Flags of the World

Flag
Flags of the federal subjects of Russia
Altai Krai